The Philadelphia Firebirds are a women's football team in the Independent Women's Football League based in Philadelphia.  They are in the Eastern Conference, North Atlantic Division with the Boston Militia, New York Nemesis, and New York Sharks.  The team was formerly known as the Philadelphia Phoenix and formerly played in the National Women's Football Association.  Upon moving to the IWFL, they changed their name so as to avoid confusion with their fellow IWFL franchise, the Carolina Phoenix.

Philadelphia's first women's tackle football team was founded in 2001 as the Philadelphia Liberty Belles. The Belles won the inaugural NWFL Championship that year. In 2002, the Belles lost in the semi-final playoff round. Heading into the 2003 season, the team split and the Philadelphia Phoenix was formed. The two teams existed simultaneously until the Philadelphia Liberty Belles eventually folded. The Liberty Belles have since reformed for the 2009 season and have joined the new WFA.

Season-by-season

|-
| colspan="6" align="center" | Philadelphia Phoenix (NWFA)
|-
|2003 || 7 || 1 || 0 || 1st North North || First-round byeWon Eastern Conference Semifinal (D.C.)Lost Eastern Conference Championship (Detroit)
|-
|2004 || 7 || 1 || 0 || 1st North North || Lost Northern Conference Qualifier (Southwest Michigan)
|-
|2005 || 4 || 4 || 0 || 13th North Division || –
|-
|2006 || 5 || 3 || 0 || 2nd North East || Lost NWFA First Round (Cleveland)
|-
|2007 || 1 || 6 || 0 || 2nd North South || –
|-
|2008 || 8 || 0 || 0 || 1st North East || First-round byeWon Northern Conference Semifinal (Columbus)Lost Northern Conference Championship (West Michigan)
|-
| colspan="6" align="center" | Philadelphia Firebirds (IWFL)
|-
|2009 || 1 || 7 || 0 || 4th Tier I East North Atlantic || –
|-
|2010 || 1 || 7 || 0 || 5th Tier I East Northeast || –
|-
|2011 || 2 || 4 || 1 || 3rd East mid-Atlantic || -
|-
!Totals || 38 || 37 || 1
|colspan="2"| (including playoffs)

Season schedules

2009

2010

** = Forfeited because of league action to reduce schedule

References

External links
Philadelphia Firebirds official website
IWFL official website

Independent Women's Football League
American football teams in Philadelphia
American football teams established in 2003
Women's sports in Pennsylvania